Eupithecia takao is a moth in the family Geometridae. It is found in Japan and Russia.

References

Moths described in 1955
takao
Moths of Japan
Moths of Asia